Rhodanobacter denitrificans is a Gram-negative and non-spore-forming bacterium from the genus of Rhodanobacter which has been isolated from sediment from a borehole from the Oak Ridge Integrated Field Research site in the United States.

References

External links
 MicrobeWiki

Xanthomonadales
Bacteria described in 2012